Cloud, Encore is a 2018 South Korean documentary film directed by Jung Sung-il. Shot in 2012 while Korean filmmaker Im Kwon-taek began filming his 102nd feature Revivre (2014), it reveals the secrets of the movie master from beginning to end. It will made its world premiere at the 23rd Busan International Film Festival in 2018.

This is Jung's third feature and his second work on a filmmaker, the first being Night and Fog in Zona (2015) on Chinese documentary filmmaker Wang Bing.

Cast
 Im Kwon-taek

Production

References

External links 
 

2018 films
2010s Korean-language films
South Korean documentary films
Films directed by Jung Sung-il
2018 documentary films
2010s South Korean films